The Sony Cyber-shot DSC-HX400V is a hyperzoom bridge digital camera that features:
 20.4 megapixel Exmor CMOS sensor
 Fast f/2.8 Carl Zeiss Vario-Sonnar T* 50× optical zoom lens
 Optical SteadyShot and Optical SteadyShot Intelligent Active Mode lens-based stabilisation to reduce blurring from shaky hands
 100× digital zoom
 Self-timer with 2s and 10s delay or automatic with 1 or 2 face detection
 Full HD (1080p) movie mode
 3:2, 4:3, 16:9, 1:1 aspect ratios
 Playback pictures in vivid clarity on any compatible 4K Ultra HD TV
 Built-in GPS to record location on photos and videos (HX400V model)
 WiFi for sharing and remote control from smartphones (HX400V model)
 NFC to enable easy sharing of pictures (HX400V model)
 BIONZ X image processor.

The camera has a 3" color LCD display and a color electronic viewfinder, and is available in two options; the DSC-HX400 and the DSC-HX400V.  The DSC-HX400V has a higher specification, including built-in GPS, WiFi and NFC. The Cyber-shot DSC-HX400V release to the USA was announced on 12 February 2014. The successor to the HX200V and the HX300 with a new sensor and Sony's latest Bionx X processor.

A battery life of up to 300 shots or 150 minutes is achieved from a rechargeable Lithium-ion battery which is recharged via the USB port. A cable and adapter are supplied allowing charging from a suitable laptop, PC or from the main supply.

One of the key limitations of the camera is the lack of RAW support.

Reviews 
http://www.sony.co.uk/electronics/cyber-shot-compact-cameras/dsc-hx400-hx400v
http://snapsort.com/cameras/Sony-Cyber-shot-DSC-HX400V
http://www.cameralabs.com/reviews/Sony_Cyber-shot_HX400V/
http://www.dpreview.com/products/sony/compacts/sony_dschx400v
http://www.photographyblog.com/reviews/sony_cybershot_dsc_hx400v_review/

References

HX400V
Superzoom cameras
Digital cameras with CMOS image sensor